Kingsburg can refer to:

Kingsburg, California
Kingsburg, Nova Scotia
Kingsburg, South Dakota

See also
Kingsbury (disambiguation)